Haratbar or Harat Bar may refer to:
 Harat Bar, Chaboksar, Rudsar County, Gilan Province
 Harat Bar, Rahimabad, Rudsar County, Gilan Province
 Haratbar, Mazandaran